Phi Phoenicis, Latinized from φ Phoenicis, is a binary star system in the southern constellation of Phoenix. It is faintly visible to the naked eye with an apparent visual magnitude of 5.1.

Primary star

The primary component is a B-type main-sequence star with a stellar classification of B9 V. It is a type of chemically peculiar star known as an HgMn star, which means it shows surface overabundances of certain elements including mercury and manganese, and deficiencies in others including helium, cobalt.

The reconstruction of the surface of Phi Phoenicis by Doppler imaging showed it to be heterogeneous with regions of different elemental abundances. In particular, the star forms spots with high or low abundances of yttrium, strontium, titanium, and chromium. The comparison of the abundance maps in different epochs revealed that the spot configurations vary on monthly or yearly time scales. The spectral lines of the irregularly distributed elements show variations that allowed a precise rotation period of 9.53 days to be determined, and also show evidence of long term abundance changes. The analysis of the spots suggests that the rotation axis is inclined to the line of sight by an angle of about 53°, and shows evidence of very weak differential rotation. The starspots probably cause milimagnitude variations in the brightness of Phi Phoenicis, even though there are no precise observations to confirm this.

The origin of the starspots and chemical anomalies in HgMn stars is uncertain and has generated controversy. Typically, such as for Ap and Bp stars, inhomogeneously distributed elements are attributed to be large-scale organized magnetic fields, but there are not conclusive detection of magnetic fields in HgMn stars. In 2012, a study claimed to have detected a weak magnetic field in Phi Phoenicis correlated with the spots, but this has been contested. It is believed that diffusion processes in the atmosphere may be related to the chemical anomalies, but this does not explain quantitatively the observed variations.

Secondary star

Phi Phoenicis is a single-lined spectroscopic binary with a period of 1126 days and an eccentricity of 0.59. There is no evidence for additional stars in the system, but in the past this has been considered a triple system, due to the detection of the wrong spectroscopic period.

The variability of the radial velocity of Phi Phoenicis was discovered in the first spectroscopic observations of the star in 1911, and was confirmed in 1982, but the data were still inclusive and no orbit was determined. The first orbital solution was finally published in 1999, yielding a period of 41.4 days. At the same time, in 1997, the Hipparcos Catalogue was published revealing Phi Phoenicis to be an astrometric binary with an estimated period of 878 days (circular orbit solution). Thus Phi Phoenicis became a triple star system, with a visible star, a spectroscopic companion, and an astrometric companion. A 2013 study, with new high-resolution radial velocity data from the FEROS, HARPS and CORALIE spectrographs, showed that the period of the spectroscopic orbit is actually closer to 1126 days, and not 41.4 days; this indicates that the spectroscopic companion is the same one that the astrometric data detected. In the same year another study fitted the astrometric data to the spectroscopic orbit, revealing the orbital inclination of the system and allowing to estimate the properties of the secondary star.

The orbit of the system is highly eccentricity and is seen almost side-on, with an inclination of 93 ± 4.7°. The high uncertainty means that the occurrence of eclipses is possible, despite being unlikely.

References

B-type main-sequence stars
Mercury-manganese stars
Spectroscopic binaries

Phoenix (constellation)
Phoenicis, Phi
0558
Durchmusterung objects
011753
008882